Le Sérac is a mountain of the Bernese Alps, located near the Sanetsch Pass in the canton of Valais. It belongs to the Wildhorn massif.

References

External links
 Le Sérac on Hikr

Mountains of the Alps
Mountains of Switzerland
Mountains of Valais
Two-thousanders of Switzerland